is an Indonesian professional surfer. He won a silver medal for Indonesia at the Southeast Asian Games in Philippines, while the gold medal was won by fellow Indonesian surfer, Oney Anwar. He was selected to represent Indonesia in the surfing category at the 2020 Summer Olympics.

Personal life
Born to Indonesian father and Japanese mother, Waida lived in Japan until he was 5 years old before moving to Bali.

Career victories

References

External links
 Rio Waida on WSL Championship Tour

2000 births
Living people
Indonesian surfers
Indonesian people of Japanese descent
Sportspeople of Japanese descent
People from Saitama Prefecture
People from Badung Regency
Sportspeople from Bali
Olympic surfers of Indonesia
Surfers at the 2020 Summer Olympics
Southeast Asian Games silver medalists for Indonesia
Southeast Asian Games medalists in surfing
21st-century Indonesian people